Orchard Square is a small open-air court shopping centre located in Sheffield, England. It opened in 1987 and contains several stores, notably Schuh, Clarks, Waterstone's (with its own instore coffee house), Subway, The Body Shop and TK Maxx (which replaced the original food court). Orchard Square also features Sheffield Creative Guild, La Coupe hair salon, Anne Heppell, Michael Spencer Jewellers, War Games Emporium and Costa.

The centrepiece of the Square is a chiming clock with moving figures that depict Sheffield's cutlery trade. To mark the centre's 21st year, Orchard Square was re-developed to facilitate the expansion of the TK Maxx to a three-level  anchor store into space formerly occupied by the Stonehouse pub. The re-development was finished in October 2008, and retailers began trading in new premises shortly before Christmas 2008.

Orchard Square features a customer loyalty card called the VIP Card. Shoppers can sign up for the card by visiting the Orchard Square website, www.orchardsquare.co.uk, or by filling in one of the application forms and putting it in the collection box by the toilets near Waterstone's. The VIP card is not a points scheme - card holders simply show the card at participating stores to receive various discounts. Regular competitions are also held for VIP card holders.

The Square is the site of the former works of John Brown & Co. which grew into one of the larger steel companies prior to nationalisation, with part of their later works site becoming Meadowhall Shopping Centre.

References

External links
Orchard Square website

Sheffield City Centre
Shopping centres in South Yorkshire
Squares in Sheffield
Tourist attractions in Sheffield